Vladimir Borisovich Obukhov (born 8 February 1992) is a Russian professional football player. He plays for FC Orenburg.

Club career
Obukhov made his Russian Premier League debut for FC Spartak Moscow on 15 April 2012 in a game against FC Rubin Kazan.

On 4 July 2019, Obukhov signed a 2-year contract with Russian Premier League club PFC Sochi. On 2 September 2019, Obukhov's Sochi contract was terminated by mutual consent. Obukhov returned to FC Tambov on the same day, signing a 2-year contract.

Rostov
On 1 October 2020, Obukhov signed for FC Rostov.

On 15 March 2021, it was reported that FIFA opened an investigation into Obukhov on suspicion of violating anti-doping rules in 2013. On 18 July 2021, he was banned from playing until the end of 2021.

Rostov terminated Obukhov's contract with the club on 9 August 2021.

Orenburg
On 9 December 2021, he signed with FC Orenburg. On 28 June 2022, Orenburg announced that Court of Arbitration for Sport ruled in favor of World Anti-Doping Agency on their appeal in Obukhov's case, and as a consequence, Obukhov received an additional six-months ban from playing. The club said Obukhov will return to the team upon serving the new ban.

References

External links
 
 

1992 births
People from Bukhara
Uzbekistani people of Russian descent
Uzbekistani footballers
Living people
Russian footballers
Association football forwards
Russia youth international footballers
Russia under-21 international footballers
Russian Premier League players
FC Spartak Moscow players
FC Torpedo Moscow players
FC Kuban Krasnodar players
FC Mordovia Saransk players
FC Tambov players
PFC Sochi players
FC Rostov players
FC Spartak-2 Moscow players
FC Orenburg players